The Femmes Fatales Championship is a women's professional wrestling championship, owned by the Canadian promotion in Femmes Fatales. Championship reigns are determined by professional wrestling matches, in which competitors are involved in scripted rivalries. These narratives create feuds between the various competitors, which cast them as villains and heroines.

Tournament

Tournament Bracket

Title history

Names

Reigns

Combined reigns

References

Women's professional wrestling championships